Kayode is a surname as well as a masculine given name of Yoruba origin.

Surname
 Adetokunbo Kayode (born 1960), Nigerian lawyer and politician
 Bunmi Kayode (born 1985), Nigerian footballer
 Femi Fani-Kayode (born 1960), Nigerian lawyer and politician, son of Remi
 Remi Fani-Kayode (1921–1995), Nigerian lawyer and politician, father of Rotimi and Femi
 Joshua Kayode (born 2000), Nigerian footballer
 Lateef Kayode (born 1983), Nigerian boxer
 Lola Fani-Kayode, Nigerian television producer
 Mariam Kayode (born 2007), Nigerian actress
 Olarenwaju Kayode (born 1993), Nigerian footballer
 Oluwapelumi Arameedey Kayode, Nigerian actress
 Oluyemi Kayode (1968–1994), Nigerian sprinter
 Princess Olufemi-Kayode, Nigerian psychologist
 Rotimi Fani-Kayode (1955–1989), Nigerian photographer, son of Remi

Given name
 Kayode Adams (?–1969), Nigerian student activist
 Kayode Adebowale (born 1962), Nigerian academic
 Kayode Ajulo (born 1974), Nigerian lawyer
 Kayode Akinsanya (born 1973), Nigerian badminton player
 Kayode Alabi (born 1963), Nigerian politician
 Kayode Are, Nigerian army colonel
 Kayode Awosika (born 1998), American football player
 Kayode Ayeni (born 1987), American basketball player
 Kayode Bankole (born 2002), Nigerian footballer
 Kayode Elegbede (born 1955), Nigerian track and field athlete
 Kayode Eso (1925–2012), Nigerian jurist
 Kayode Kasum, Nigerian film director
 Kayode McKinnon (born 1979), Guyanese footballer
 Kayode Odejayi (born 1982), Nigerian footballer
 Kayode Oduoye (born 1970), Nigerian lawyer and politician
 Kayode Oladele (born 1963), Nigerian lawyer and politician
 Kayode Olofin-Moyin, Nigerian politician and navy officer
 Kayode Otitoju (born 1955), Nigerian politician
 Kayode Sofola, Nigerian jurist
 Kayode Soremekun, Nigerian academic
 Kayode Williams, Nigerian activist
 Sikiru Kayode Adetona (born 1934), Yoruba monarch
 Azeez Kayode Fakeye (born 1965), Nigerian sculptor
 Lateef Kayode Jakande (1929–2021), Nigerian journalist and politician
 Samson Kayode Olaleye (Hoàng Vũ Samson) (born 1988), Nigerian-Vietnamese footballer